Serbian Orthodox Eparchy of Slavonia  is an eparchy (diocese) of the Serbian Orthodox Church encompassing areas of western and central Slavonia, in modern Croatia. Since 2014, the Eparchy is headed by bishop Jovan Ćulibrk.

History 
During the Middle Ages, the Banate of Slavonia was under the rule of Hungarian kings. By the 15th century, some eastern regions of Slavonia were inhabited by Serbs, who settled there after fleeing Bosnia, even before the Ottoman conquest in 1463. Since Serbs were Eastern Orthodox Christians, some tensions occurred with local Catholic Church. In 1438, pope Eugene IV (1431-1447) sent the inquisitor Giacomo della Marca to Slavonia as a missionary, with instruction to convert "schismatic" Serbs to "Roman religion", and if that should fail, to banish them. During that period, Serbian nobility was also present in the region. In 1454, Serbian Orthodox liturgical book, the Varaždin Apostol was written in Upper-Slavonian city of Varaždin, for princess Katarina Branković of Serbia, wife of Ulrich II, Count of Celje.

In the first half of the 16th century, entire Slavonia was devastated by frequent wars. Serbian despot Pavle Bakić fell at the Battle of Gorjani in Slavonia (1537), defending the region from the Ottoman Turks. By that time, eastern part known as Lower Slavonia was conquered by the Ottomans, while the western part (known as Upper Slavonia) came under the Habsburg rule. Since the renewal of the Serbian Patriarchate of Peć in 1557, the Orthodox Serbs of Lower Slavonia were placed under jurisdiction of the Eparchy of Požega, centered at the Orahovica Monastery. In 1595, Serbian Orthodox metropolitan Vasilije of Požega moved to Upper Slavonia, under Habsburg rule, in order to avoid the Turkish oppression.

Historically, the Eparchy was known as Eparchy of Požega (Пожешка епархија) in 16th and 17th century, and later as Eparchy of Pakrac (Пакрачка епархија). During 18th and 19th century, it was under jurisdiction of the Serbian Orthodox Metropolitanate of Karlovci. Since 1920, it belongs to the united Serbian Orthodox Church.

Heads

Metropolitans of Požega (Lower Slavonia) 
 Josif (around 1585), 
 Vasilije (around 1590-1595),
 Sofronije (during 16th or 17th century),
 Grigorije (during 16th or 17th century),
 Stefan (around 1641).

Bishops of Pakrac (Lower Slavonia)  
 Sofronije Podgoričanin (1705-1710),
 Vasilije Rajić (1710-1714),
 Gavrilo Popović (1715-1716),
 Atanasije Radošević (1717-1720),
 Nikifor Stefanović (1721-1743),
 Sofronije Jovanović (1743-1757),
 Vićentije Jovanović Vidak (1757-1759), administration
 Arsenije Radivojević (1759-1769),
 Atanasije Živković (1770-1781),
 Josif Jovanović Šakabenta (1781-1783),
 Pavle Avakumović (178?-1786),
 Kiril Živković (1786-1807),
 Josif Putnik (1808-1828),
 Georgije Hranislav (1829-1839),
 Stefan Popović (1839-1843),
 Stefan Kragujević (1843-1864),
 Nikanor Grujić (1864-1887),
 Miron Nikolić (1890-1941),
 Damaskin Grdanički (1945-1951), administration

Bishops of Slavonia 
 Emilijan Marinović (1952-1981),
 Lukijan Pantelić (1985-1999),
 Sava Jurić (1999-2013),
 Jovan Ćulibrk (since 2014)

See also 
 Serbs of Croatia
 Eastern Orthodoxy in Croatia
 List of the Eparchies of the Serbian Orthodox Church

References

Bibliography

External links
 
 The Serbs in the Former SR of Croatia
 Spiritual Genocide: The Diocese of Slavonia
 Bishop Jovan: Historiography of the Holocaust in Yugoslavia

Serbian Orthodox Church in Croatia
Serbian minority institutions and organizations in Croatia
1557 establishments in Europe
Religious organizations established in the 1550s
Religious sees of the Serbian Orthodox Church
16th-century establishments in Croatia